Arrie may refer to:

 Ma Barker (1873–1935), sometimes known as Arizona Barker or Arrie Barker, mother of several noted American criminals
 Arrie W. Davis (born 1940), American lawyer and jurist
 Arrie Schoeman (born 1966), South African cricketer
 Arrie, Sweden, a locality in Vellinge Municipality

See also
 Arrie Church, Arrie, Sweden
 Arry (disambiguation)
 Ari (disambiguation)